The 1975 Giro di Lombardia was the 69th edition of the Giro di Lombardia cycle race and was held on 11 October 1975. The race started in Milan and finished in Como. The race was won by Francesco Moser of the Filotex team.

General classification

References

1975
Giro di Lombardia
Giro di Lombardia
1975 Super Prestige Pernod